Fabien Bacquet (born 28 February 1986 in Soissons) is a French former professional road cyclist.

Major results

2004
 3rd Route de l'Avenir
2008
 6th Scheldeprijs
 8th Nokere-Koerse
2009
 1st Stage 4 Tour de Normandie
 4th Grand Prix de la Ville de Nogent-sur-Oise
 6th Grand Prix de Fourmies
 7th GP de Denain
 8th Grand Prix de la Somme
 10th Grand Prix de la Ville de Lillers
2010
 6th Grand Prix de la Ville de Lillers
 10th Overall Boucles de la Mayenne
2011
 1st Stages 4 & 6 Tour de Normandie
 2nd Grand Prix de la Ville de Lillers
 9th GP de Denain
 10th Flèche d'Emeraude
 9th Cholet-Pays de Loire
2012
 3rd Grand Prix de Denain
 5th Grand Prix de la ville de Pérenchies
 6th Châteauroux Classic
 7th Flèche d'Emeraude
2013
 4th Route Adélie
 7th Classic Loire Atlantique

References

1986 births
Living people
French male cyclists
People from Soissons
Sportspeople from Aisne
Cyclists from Hauts-de-France
21st-century French people